Loriges is a commune in the Allier department in central France.

Population

See also 
 Communes of the Allier department

References 

Communes of Allier
Allier communes articles needing translation from French Wikipedia